Private First Class William Bernard Baugh (July 7, 1930 – November 29, 1950) was a United States Marine who, at age 20, received the Medal of Honor for his actions at the Battle of Chosin Reservoir in the Korean War.

The nation's highest decoration for valor was presented to Baugh for extraordinary heroism on November 29, 1950, between Koto-ri and Hagaru-ri, when he protected the members of his squad from a grenade by smothering it with his body.

Biography
Private First Class Baugh was the 15th Marine to receive the Medal of Honor for heroism during the Korean War. Born July 7, 1930, in McKinney, Kentucky, William Bernard Baugh was employed by Harrison Shoe Corporation before his enlistment in the Marine Corps on January 23, 1948, at the age of 17. He attended public schools in Butler County, Ohio.

Following recruit training at Parris Island, South Carolina, PFC Baugh was stationed at Marine Corps Base Camp Lejeune, North Carolina, and after being transferred to the 1st Marine Division in Korea, took part in the Inchon landing, the capture of Seoul, and the Wonsan and Chosin Reservoir campaigns. His death occurred in the Chosin area.

In addition to the Medal of Honor, PFC Baugh posthumously received the Purple Heart Medal. He previously held the Presidential Unit Citation, Navy Occupation Service Medal with Europe Clasp, Korean Service Medal with three bronze stars, and the United Nations Service Medal.

Awards and decorations
PFC Baugh's awards include:

Medal of Honor citation

Honors
The Military Sealift Command ship MV PFC William B. Baugh (T-AK-3001) is also named in his honor.

See also

List of Medal of Honor recipients
List of Korean War Medal of Honor recipients

References

 

1930 births
1950 deaths
People from Lincoln County, Kentucky
Military personnel from Kentucky
American military personnel killed in the Korean War
United States Marine Corps Medal of Honor recipients
United States Marines
United States Marine Corps reservists
Korean War recipients of the Medal of Honor
Deaths by hand grenade
United States Marine Corps personnel of the Korean War